Oasis is Roberta Flack's first solo album of newly recorded songs since 1982's I'm the One. (Subsequent to her 1983 duet album with Peabo Bryson: Born to Love, Flack had with producer Ahmet Ertegun in 1985 recorded fourteen lesser known mid-twentieth century R&B songs but the tracks, intended for a Miss Melody and the Uptown Harlem Stompers album, were not completed to the satisfaction of Flack who put the project "on hold": the tracks remain unreleased.) Released 1 November 1988, Oasis features the number-one U.S. singles, "Oasis" (R&B), and "Uh-uh Ooh-ooh Look Out (Here It Comes)" (Dance/Club Play).

Track listing
"Oasis" (Marcus Miller, Mark Stephens) - 6:09
"All Caught Up in Love" (Siedah Garrett, Marvin Hamlisch) - 4:06
"Uh-Uh Ooh-Ooh Look Out (Here It Comes)" (Nickolas Ashford, Valerie Simpson) - 4:40
"Shock to My System" ; Duet with Simon Climie (Franne Golde, Andy Goldmark, Dennis Lambert) - 4:24
"You Who Brought Me Love" (Andy Goldmark) - 4:00
"Something Magic" (Marcus Miller, Mark Stephens) - 4:04
"And So It Goes" (Roberta Flack, Maya Angelou, Barry Miles) - 3:34
"You Know What It's Like" (Roberta Flack, Barry Miles, Brenda Russell) - 4:45
"And So It Goes (Reprise)" (Roberta Flack, Maya Angelou, Barry Miles) - 1:00
"My Someone to Love" (Roberta Flack, Marcus Miller) - 5:51
"(His Name) Brazil" (Roberta Flack, Henry Gaffney, Andy Goldmark) - 4:51

Personnel 
 Roberta Flack – lead vocals, backing vocals (1, 7, 9, 10), acoustic piano (10)
 Marcus Miller – keyboards (1, 10), bass (1, 6, 10), backing vocals (1, 6, 10), synthesizers (6)
 Jason Miles – synthesizer programming (1, 4, 5, 10), keyboards (4, 5), additional synthesizer programming (6, 8)
 Michael Omartian – keyboards (2), drums (2), arrangements (2)
 Randy Kerber – keyboards (3, 11), synthesizers (7, 8, 9), synthesizer programming (11)
 Michael Boddicker – synthesizers (3)
 John Barnes – keyboards (4), synthesizer programming (4)
 Andy Goldmark – keyboards (4, 5, 11), synthesizer programming (4, 5, 11), drum programming (4, 11), instrumental arrangements (4), drum machine (5)
 Greg Phillinganes – keyboards (4, 5, 11), synthesizer programming (4, 5, 11)
 J. Peter Robinson – keyboards (4, 5, 11), synthesizer programming (4, 5, 11)
 Jeff Bova – synthesizer programming (6)
 Barry Miles – synthesizers (7, 9), arrangements (7, 8, 9), LinnDrum (8), sequencing (8), electric piano (10)
 Jeff Lorber – keyboards (11), synthesizer programming (11)
 Dann Huff – guitar (2)
 Michael Landau – guitar (3, 7, 8, 9)
 Paul Jackson Jr. – guitar (4, 11)
 Earl Klugh – acoustic guitar solo (7, 9)
 Chieli Minucci– guitar (11)
 Neil Stubenhaus – bass (3, 7, 9)
 Nathan East – bass (11)
 Harvey Mason – drums (3)
 Jimmy Bralower – drum overdubs (4)
 Steve Ferrone – drum overdubs (4)
 John Robinson – drums (7, 8, 9), Forat F16 (8)
 Buddy Williams – drums (8), Forat F16 (8)
 Steve Gadd – drums (10)
 Steve Thornton – percussion (1, 6)
 Paulinho da Costa – percussion (3, 5, 11)
 Michael Fisher – percussion (7, 8, 9)
 Don Alias – percussion (10)
 David Sanborn – alto sax solo (1)
 Larry Williams – saxophone solo (2), keyboards (5), synthesizer programming (5), synthesizers (7, 8, 9)
 Dan Higgins – saxophone (3, 8)
 Roger Byam – tenor sax solo (10)
 Jerry Hey – trumpet (3), arrangements (3, 7, 8, 9)
 Dennis Collins – backing vocals (1)
 Lani Groves – backing vocals (1)
 Chude Mondlane – backing vocals (1)
 Mark Stevens – backing vocals (1, 6)
 Brenda White-King – backing vocals (1)
 Phil Perry – backing vocals (3, 7, 8, 9)
 Simon Climie – lead vocals (4)
 Tawatha Agee – backing vocals (6)
 Yvonne Lewis – backing vocals (6)
 Lori Ann Velez – backing vocals (6)
 Gabrielle Goodman – backing vocals (7, 8, 9, 11)
 George Duke – backing vocals (11)
 Robert Henley – backing vocals (11)

Production 
 Marcus Miller – producer (1, 6, 10)
 Michael Omartian – producer (2)
 Jerry Hey – producer (3, 7, 8, 9)
 Andy Goldmark – producer (4, 5, 11)
 Barry Miles – producer (7, 8, 9)
 Roberta Flack – executive producer (1, 4-11)
 Quincy Jones – executive producer (2, 3)
 Bibi Green – production coordinator (1, 6, 10)
 Scott Mabuchi – engineer (1, 6)
 Bruce Miller – engineer (1, 6, 10)
 David Ahlert – engineer (2)
 Terry Christian – engineer (2), mixing (2)
 Mick Guzauski – engineer (3), mixing (3)
 David Dachinger – engineer (4, 5, 11)
 Neil Dorfsman – engineer (4)
 Jay Rifkin – engineer (4)
 Joe Ferla – engineer (5)
 Barney Perkins – engineer (5)
 Eric Calvi – engineer (7, 8, 9)
 Daren Klein – engineer (7, 9)
 Bob Brockmann – engineer (11)
 Glen Holguin – engineer (11)
 Steve Peck – engineer (11)
 Eugene "UE" Nastasi – assistant engineer (1, 5, 6)
 Corky Stasisk – assistant engineer (1)
 Doug Carlton – assistant engineer (2)
 Richard McKernan – assistant engineer (3), engineer (7, 8, 9)
 Paul Angelli – assistant engineer (4)
 Jack Rizzo – assistant engineer (4)
 Jack Rouben – assistant engineer (4)
 Richard Joseph – assistant engineer (5)
 Angela Piva – assistant engineer (5)
 Bridget Daly – assistant engineer (6)
 Danny Mormando – assistant engineer (6)
 Mike Kloster – assistant engineer (7, 8, 9)
 Tom Durack – assistant engineer (10)
 Ray Bardani – mixing (1, 6, 10)
 Tommy Vicari – mixing (4, 5, 11)
 Bill Schnee – mixing (7, 8, 9)
 Debi Cornish – mix assistant (1, 10), assistant engineer (4)
 Jim Dineen – mix assistant (4, 11)
 Pat MacDougall – mix assistant (5)
 Wade Jaynes – mix assistant (7, 8, 9)
 Ryan Dorn – mix assistant (11)
 Doug Sax – mastering 
 Sylvia Rhone – album coordinator 
 Bob Defrin – art direction, design 
 Tom Feelings – cover portrait

Studios 
 Recorded and Mixed at Right Track Recording, Electric Lady Studios, Unique Recording Studios, Marathon Studios and Skyline Studios (New York City, New York); Master Sound Astoria (Astoria, New York); Conway Studios and Sunset Sound (Hollywood, California); Bill Schnee Studios (North Hollywood, California); Lighthouse Studios (Los Angeles, California); Homeland Studio (London, UK).
 Mastered at The Mastering Lab (Hollywood, California).

Charts

Weekly charts

Year-end charts

References 

Roberta Flack albums
1988 albums
Atlantic Records albums